Kisan Mazdoor ('Peasant-Worker') is an Urdu language, weekly newspaper, published by the Communist Party of India (Marxist) from Kolkata.

Kisan Mazdoor was founded in May 1968 as a progressive Urdu weekly, by people close to CPI(M). As of 1969 it had a circulation of around 2,000. Mohammed Amin, parliamentarian and West Bengal Minister of Transport, served as editor of Kisan Mazdoor 1968-1986.

As of 1983 Kisan Mazdoor had its offices at Chandni Chowk, but later shifted to the CPI(M) state headquarters at Alimuddin Street.

Around 2014 the publication claimed a circulation of 15,940.

References

Publications established in 1968
1968 establishments in West Bengal
Urdu-language newspapers published in India
Communist newspapers
Mass media in Kolkata
Weekly newspapers published in India
Communist Party of India (Marxist)